Thomas Lamparter (born 9 June 1978) is a Swiss former bobsledder who has competed since 2002. Competing in three Winter Olympics, he won a bronze medal in the four-man event at Turin in 2006 as part of the crew of Martin Annen.

Lamparter also won two medals at the 2007 FIBT World Championships in St. Moritz with a gold in the four-man event (piloted by Ivo Rüegg) and a bronze at the bobsleigh-skeleton mixed team event. Lamparter also enjoyed success as a brakeman in two-man competition alongside Beat Hefti, with the pair winning European Championship golds in 2010 and 2013, a World Championship silver in 2013, and Bobsleigh World Cup titles in 2009 and 2012.

In March 2014 Lamparter announced his retirement from competition.

References

Bobsleigh four-man Olympic medalists for 1924, 1932–56, and since 1964
Bobsleigh four-man world championship medalists since 1930

Mixed bobsleigh-skeleton world championship medalists since 2007

1978 births
Bobsledders at the 2006 Winter Olympics
Bobsledders at the 2010 Winter Olympics
Bobsledders at the 2014 Winter Olympics
Living people
Olympic bobsledders of Switzerland
Olympic bronze medalists for Switzerland
Swiss male bobsledders
Place of birth missing (living people)
Olympic medalists in bobsleigh
Medalists at the 2006 Winter Olympics